The Recruiting Act 1779 (19 Geo.3 c.10) was an Act of the Parliament of Great Britain. It was a press Act for the recruiting of his Majesty's Land Forces. After the losses in the American Revolutionary War and the apprehended hostilities with France, the existing voluntary enlistment measures were judged to be insufficient. It served as a revision of the Recruiting Act 1778.

It raised the bounty £3, 3s. After the expiration of their service, volunteers were exempt from the performance of statue (highway) duty, for service as parish officers, and from service in the army, navy, or militia.  They were allowed to set up and exercise any trade in any place in Great Britain.

It enlarged those subject to impressment beyond smugglers and "all able-bodied and disorderly persons" to include those "convicted of running away from and leaving their families chargeable upon the parish". The chief advantage of this Act was in the number of volunteers brought in under the apprehension of impressment.

The Act received royal assent on 9 February 1779. On 26 May 1780 it was repealed with the exception of the parts relating to volunteers. It was wholly repealed by the Statute Law Revision Act 1871.

References
 Curtis, Edward, The Organization of the British Army in the American Revolution. 1972,

External links
 Recruiting Act 1779, text

Great Britain Acts of Parliament 1779
British laws relating to the American Revolution
American Revolutionary War
Repealed Great Britain Acts of Parliament